Donald Murray may refer to:

 Sir Donald Murray (judge) (1923–2018), Lord Justice of Appeal of the Supreme Court of Northern Ireland
 Donald Murray (politician) (1862–1923), Liberal Party politician in Scotland
 Donald Murray (writer) (1924–2006), American journalist and teacher
 Donald Murray (inventor) (1865–1945), electrical engineer and inventor of the telegraphic typewriter
 Donald Gaines Murray (1914–1986), first African-American to enter the University of Maryland School of Law since 1890
 Donald Walter Gordon Murray, Canadian cardiac surgeon

See also 
 Don Murray (disambiguation)
 Donald Murphy (disambiguation)